Hans Rudolf Künsch (born 17 October 1951) is a Swiss mathematician and statistician based in Zürich, where he has been a professor with the Seminar für Statistik since 1983 at the Eidgenössische Technische Hochschule (Swiss Federal Institute of Technology). As of 2007, Künsch is the Chair of ETH Zürich's Department of Mathematics. He was a co-editor of the leading journal Annals of Statistics during the 1998–2000 period and has served on the Council of the worldwide organisation Institute of Mathematical Statistics.

Künsch worked as a research student at the University of Tokyo with a scholarship grant from the Japanese government. After completing his PhD at ETH Zürich, with a dissertation project on Reellwertige Zufallsfelder auf einem Gitter: Interpolationsprobleme, Variationsprinzip und statistische Analyse, he returned to research work in Japan, at the University of Tokyo and the Institute of Statistical Mathematics. Since 1983 he has held various academic positions with his alma mater ETH Zürich.

Professor Künsch's main research areas are spatial statistics and random fields (geostatistics, parameter estimation for Gibbs fields, image analysis, space-time models); time series analysis (long range dependence, bootstrap methods for dependent data, general state-space models); and robust statistics and statistical model selection. Among his most frequently cited contributions is the Annals of Statistics 1989 article on bootstrapping and jackknifing in stationary time series.

External links 
 Künsch's home page
 Seminar für Statistik with the ETH
 Department of Mathematics at the ETH

1951 births
Living people
Swiss statisticians
20th-century Swiss mathematicians
21st-century Swiss  mathematicians
Academic staff of ETH Zurich
Annals of Statistics editors
Spatial statisticians
Mathematical statisticians